George Gage (fl. 1614–1640) was an English Roman Catholic political agent and an art connoisseur.

Biography
Gage, born after 1582, seems to have been son of John Gage of Haling, Surrey, and brother of Sir Henry Gage, to whom he erected a monument. He was a great friend of Sir Toby Matthew, and seems to have received priest's orders with him from the hands of Cardinal Bellarmine at Rome on 20 May 1614.

James I despatched him to Rome towards the close of 1621, in quality of agent to the papal court, to solicit a dispensation for the marriage of Prince Charles with the Spanish infanta Maria Anna (see the Spanish Match). The Jesuits strove to retard the dispensation, and if possible to prevent the completion of the match. The negotiations lasted for nearly six years, and ultimately came to nothing. Gage is described in 1627 as a prisoner in the Clink, being the agent of the Bishop of Chalcedon and of the seminary of Douay. He is referred to in the list of priests and recusants apprehended and indicted by Captain James Wadsworth and his fellow pursuivants between 1640 and 1651. It is there stated that he was found guilty "and since is dead", from which it may be inferred that he died in prison.

Notes

References

Attribution

Year of birth missing
Year of death missing
17th-century English people
17th-century Roman Catholics
Place of birth missing